Daphnella corimbensis is a species of sea snail, a marine gastropod mollusk in the family Raphitomidae.

References

External links
 Rolán E., Otero-Schmitt J. & Fernandes F. (1998) The family Turridae s. l. (Mollusca, Neogastropoda) in Angola (West Africa). 1. Subfamily Daphnellinae. Iberus, 16: 95–118

corimbensis
Gastropods described in 1998